This is a list of fictional characters from DC Comics who are members of the Metal Men.

References

  Content in this article was copied from DC Comics Database, which is licensed under the Creative Commons Attribution-Share Alike 3.0 (Unported) (CC-BY-SA 3.0) license.

Lists of DC Comics characters
DC Comics superheroes
Members